The men's welterweight (67 kg/147.4 lbs) Full-Contact category at the W.A.K.O. European Championships 2004 in Budva was the sixth lightest of the male Full-Contact tournaments and involved twelve participants.  Each of the matches was three rounds of two minutes each and were fought under Full-Contact kickboxing rules.

As there were too few men for a tournament designed for sixteen four of the fighters received byes through to the quarter finals.  The gold medal was won by Jere Reinikainen from Finland who defeated Roman Pijouk from Russia by split decision in the final.  It was a second W.A.K.O. gold for Jere who was also the reigning W.A.K.O. world champion from the event in Paris in 2003.  Semi final losers Edmond Mebenga from France and Sinisa Vladimirovic from the host nation Serbia and Montenegro were awarded with bronze medals.

Results

Key

See also
List of WAKO Amateur European Championships
List of WAKO Amateur World Championships
List of male kickboxers

References

External links
 WAKO World Association of Kickboxing Organizations Official Site

W.A.K.O. European Championships 2004 (Budva)